The California State University, San Bernardino College of Social and Behavioral Sciences is one of six academic colleges at CSUSB located in San Bernardino, California, United States. Comprising ten departments/schools and various specialties, the college offers bachelor's and master's. The college strives to produce educated graduates who possess both a fundamental understanding of their fields and the essential professional skills needed by local and regional industries. The college provides business information for all California State University, San Bernardino graduates. The college has many accredited programs.

Part of the college, the National Security Studies master of arts program is a highly regarded, two-year program that offers a comprehensive curriculum for students interested in pursuing careers in national service. It is one of three such programs in the country and the only one in the California State University system. The university also has collaborative educational programs with nearby Fort Irwin.

Academics

Degrees
 BA
 BS
 MA
 MS

Departments & Schools
The College of Social and Behavioral Sciences includes several academic departments/schools:
 Anthropology
 Criminal Justice
 Economics
 Geography
 History
 Political Science
 Psychology
 Social Work
 Sociology

See also
California State University, San Bernardino

References

External links 

 

California State University, San Bernardino